Kuna Peak is a summit on the boundary between Mono and Tuolumne counties, in the United States, is the highest point on Kuna Crest.

Name
The word Kuna probably derives from a Shoshonean or  word meaning "fire," appearing in the Mono dialect of the area, with a meaning of firewood. On the summit, there are many jagged pieces of rock which resemble fire themselves; see Kuna Crest Granodiorite.

Geography
Kuna Peak is flanked by shorter peaks all of which are nearly equal in height, such as Koip Peak, which is a mile to the east, and is  feet lower. The western side of Kuna Peak is in Yosemite National Park, the eastern side being in the Ansel Adams Wilderness.

The following features are near Kuna Peak:
 Bingaman Lake
 Donohue Peak
 Koip Peak
 Helen Lake
 Kuna Lake
 Mammoth Peak
 Mono Pass
 Mount Andrea Lawrence
 Mount Lewis
 Parker Peak
 Spillway Lake

Gallery

References

Mountains of Mono County, California
Mountains of Tuolumne County, California
Mountains of Yosemite National Park
Mountains of the Ansel Adams Wilderness
Mountains of Northern California